Devil's Night Out is the debut studio album by The Mighty Mighty Bosstones. It was released in 1990 by Taang! Records. It was one of the first albums to mix ska and hardcore punk.

Production
The album was produced by Paul Kolderie. Jimmy Gestapo, of Murphy's Law, duets on "A Little Bit Ugly."

Critical reception
AllMusic called the album "an energetic, skankin' party album fusing ska with punk and hard rock, with more of an emphasis on ska than the band would show on later records." The New Rolling Stone Album Guide wrote that the album "doesn't blend ska and hardcore so much as it bashes them together." Trouser Press called it "a strong and confident debut."

Track listing
All tracks written by Dicky Barrett and Joe Gittleman

"Devil's Night Out" – 2:35
"Howwhywuz, Howwhyam" – 2:32
"Drunks And Children" – 2:36
"Hope I Never Lose My Wallet" – 2:06
"Haji" – 2:03
"The Bartender's Song" – 2:16
"Patricia" – 2:48
"The Cave (Cognito Fiesta Version)" – 2:12
"Do Somethin' Crazy" – 2:27
"A Little Bit Ugly" – 3:47

Japan CD bonus tracks
"Ain't Talkin' 'Bout Love" – 2:26
"Enter Sandman" – 2:57
Previously available on Where'd You Go? EP.

Personnel
Dicky Barrett – lead vocals, artwork
Nate Albert – guitar, backing vocals
Joe Gittleman – bass, backing vocals
Tim "Johnny Vegas" Burton – saxophone, backing vocals
Tim Bridewell – trombone
Josh Dalsimer – drums
Ben Carr – Bosstone, backing vocals
Davey Holmes – keyboards, backing vocals 
Bill Conway – trombone, percussion, backing vocals
Vinny Nobile of the Bim Skala Bim – horns 
Mike Costello – harmonica
Jimmy Gestapo – guest vocals on track 10
Paul Q. Kolderie  – producer, engineer
Sean Slade  – producer, engineer
Rob Dimit – engineer
R. Spencer – graphic design, layout design
Jane Gulick – design

References

1990 debut albums
The Mighty Mighty Bosstones albums
Albums produced by Paul Q. Kolderie